Gyros is a genus of moths of the family Crambidae.

Species
Gyros atripennalis Barnes & McDunnough, 1914
Gyros muirii (H. Edwards, 1881)
Gyros powelli Munroe, 1959

References

Odontiini
Crambidae genera